Uhami (Ishua) is an Edoid language of the Ondo State, Nigeria. It is sometimes considered the same language as Iyayu.

References

External links
The Victoria Nyanza. The Land, the Races and their Customs, with Specimens of Some of the Dialects featuring grammar, pronunciation, and vocabularies of the Uhami language 

Edoid languages